SS Aberdeen was a British cargo liner launched in 1882. She was designed for service from London to Australia. She was the first ship to be successfully powered by a triple expansion steam engine. The triple expansion engine then became the standard type of steam engine to be installed in seagoing vessels. The fuel economy achieved meant that steam could now outcompete sail on all major commercial routes.

Aberdeen was sold in 1906 to the Ottoman government. She served as a Turkish troopship in World War I until a British submarine sank her in 1915.

Design and construction
Aberdeen was designed as the first steamship in the fleet of the Aberdeen Line, intended for high speed service between the United Kingdom and Australia and the Far East. She was constructed at Govan in the shipyard of Robert Napier and Sons on Clydeside, Scotland. Triple expansion engines required much higher boiler pressures than was readily available from the contemporary technology. Propontis had boiler problems from the outset.  had been the planned boiler pressure, but the replacement boilers that had to be fitted could only achieve .

These boilers had patent corrugated furnaces that overcame the competing problems of heat transfer and sufficient strength to deal with the boiler pressure. This was a reduction in fuel consumption of about 60%, compared to a typical steamer built ten years earlier. This level of efficiency meant that steamships could now operate as the primary method of maritime transport in the vast majority of commercial situations. This left no significant routes in which sail clearly outcompeted steam. Triple expansion steam engines would continue to power major vessels throughout the world for the next seventy years.

Aberdeen had clipper bows and three barque-rigged masts. As built, there was accommodation for 12 first-class passengers and, on the outward voyage to Australia, 450 third-class passengers. This was later increased.

British service (1882–1906)
Aberdeen began her maiden voyage on 30 March 1882, under the command of Charles Matheson, who had previously been captain of Thermopylae. This took a triangular route. The outward leg started from London, picked up passengers at Plymouth, made a coaling stop at Cape Town and arrived at Melbourne on 14 May, having logged 44 days of steaming. She unloaded at Melbourne and Sydney, then took a cargo of New South Wales coal to Shanghai. The third leg of the triangle was tea from Foochow (Fuzhou), back to London via the Suez Canal, with intermediate stops at Hong Kong and Singapore. This triangular route was necessary because there was a shortage of cargoes to take back to London from Australia at that time of year. It replicated the route taken by the sailing fleet of the Aberdeen Line. Aberdeens second voyage was directly to and from Australia, carrying a cargo of wool on the return trip. This was the pattern of trade for her first seven years: two voyages to Australia a year, with the return trip alternating between wool from the Australian wool sales and tea from China (with coal from Australia to China).

Aberdeens triangular trade was in competition with shipowners who had steamers in the China to London trade. These operated a cartel called the China and Japan Conference, which sought to control the rates of freight from China. They attempted to prevent non-conference ships from competing by invoking their ability to remove retrospective rebates in freight rates from shippers who sent any cargoes on ships that were not a member of the conference. This culminated in a court case in 1887, which the Conference won in the High Court, the Court of Appeal, and then in the House of Lords. In 1889, Aberdeen ceased making return trips via China and concentrated on a service directly to and from Australia.

She was modernised in 1892 and again in 1896, when electric light and refrigeration were installed. Her last voyage with the Aberdeen Line was to Sydney and started on 19 December 1905.

Turkish service (1906–1915)
In 1906, she was sold to the Turkish government and renamed SS Halep. She was employed as a troopship and a ferry on the Black Sea. 
During the Gallipoli campaign of World War I, she was refitted into a hospital ship, assigned to the Hilal-i Ahmer (Ottoman Turkish for Red Crescent) to transport wounded soldiers to the Selimiye Barracks in Istanbul, which was converted into a military hospital.

On 25 August 1915, the Royal Navy submarine HMS E11 torpedoed her at the Akbaş Jetty in Çanakkale harbour. It is estimated that two hundred of the crew and soldiers on board were killed. The shipwreck lies  under water off Akbaş.

On 25 August 2022, a rally and a dive on the shipwreck took place, to commemorate and pay tibute to the soldiers and medical personnel who died during the incident.

Notes

References

1881 ships
Ships built on the River Clyde
Cargo liners
Ships of the Aberdeen Line
Ships of the Ottoman Empire
World War I naval ships of the Ottoman Empire
Troop ships
Hospital ships
Ships sunk by British submarines
World War I shipwrecks in the Dardanelles